Eleanor Manning O'Connor (June 27, 1884 – July 12, 1973) was an American architect and educator passionate about the creation of decent public housing for all.

Early life and education
Eleanor Manning O'Connor was born in 1884 to Irish immigrant parents, Delia Josephine Grady and James Manning, a building contractor in Lynn, Massachusetts. She attended Lynn Classical High School and received an S.B. degree in architecture in 1906. Her thesis was entitled "Design for a Country Residence." She served as the president of Cleofan, MIT's club for women in her senior year.

Architectural practice
Two years after graduation, O'Connor accepted a position as a draftsman with another architect and MIT graduate, Lois Lilley Howe. In 1912, she took an extended leave of absence and traveled in Europe with her associate and classmate Eliza J. Newkirk Rogers, creating watercolors of the buildings she observed. 
She cut short the trip to accept an offer of partnership from Howe and joined the firm calling themselves Howe and Manning, 
America's fourth firm of female architects, later Howe, Manning & Almy, Inc. 
The firm frequently worked on remodeling and renovating outdated structures and O'Connor coined the term "renovising" to describe their work.

In the 1920s, O'Connor worked with Lois Howe and other architects on the Village of Mariemont, a planned community in Hamilton County, Ohio.

During this period one of her major works was a commission from WPA for low-cost housing in an Irish neighborhood in South Boston called the Old Harbor Housing Project, constructed 1933-1938. She worked with other architects in a collaboration known as the Seventeen Associated Architects. This project, consisting of three story apartments and two story townhouses was distinguished for its residential appeal as compared to the sterile atmosphere of most public housing. Biographer Doris Cole  says that O'Connor was the partner most concerned about social issues and her concerns reflected the detailing, choice of materials and attention to proportion that contribute to the appeal of the project. Subsequently, O'Connor served on numerous housing commissions and councils at the city, state and national levels.

Educator
After WWI, O'Connor began lecturing at Simmons College as a Special Instructor of Architecture and later of Housing, a position that she held for 50 years
. During the 1930s she also taught at Pine Manor Junior College, Chamberlain School for Retailing, and Garland College. 
She lectured frequently in the New England area on housing throughout her career.

Collaboration with Johnson O'Connor
In 1931, Eleanor Manning married the American psychometrician, researcher, and educator Johnson O'Connor, founder of the Johnson O'Connor Research Foundation. At the foundation, she championed the causes of women and encouraged women to enter into the fields of engineering, medicines and science.

O'Connor died in Mexico in 1973 while researching Indian cultures and is buried beside her husband in Newport Beach, California. She was survived by O'Connor's engineer son, Chadwell O'Connor.

Writings
 Eleanor Manning, "Architecture as a Profession for Women", "Simmons Review", Simmons College, April 1934, 71-75
 Eleanor Manning, "Buildings for the National Welfare", National Altrusan, March 1935.

See also
Howe, Manning & Almy, Inc.

Notes

References
 Sarah Allaback, "The First American Women Architects", University of Illinois Press, 2008,
 Doris Cole; Karen Cord Taylor; Sylvia Moore, "The lady architects : Lois Lilley Howe, Eleanor Manning, and Mary Almy : 1893-1937", Midmarch Arts Press, 1990,
 Boston Globe, "Eleanor O'Connor, architect and teacher", July 13, 1973.
 MIT Institute Archives and Special Collections, Manuscript Collection MC 9.
 Wyatt, George. "Johnson O'Connor: A Portrait From Memory", EPM Publications, Inc., 2002.

External links
 Watercolors by Eleanor Manning O'Connor 
 Johnson O'Connor: A Portrait From Memory 
 Johnson O'Connor Research Foundation 

1884 births
1973 deaths
20th-century American architects
20th-century American educators
American people of Irish descent
American women architects
20th-century American women
Architects from Lynn, Massachusetts
Architects from Boston